Tift College was a private liberal arts women's college located in Forsyth, Georgia. Founded in 1849, the college ceased operations in 1987, after being merged with Mercer University in nearby Macon, Georgia. 

The campus facilities have been adapted for use as the headquarters of the Georgia Department of Corrections. The facility is known as State Offices South at Tift College (SOSTC). The  campus is 20 miles north of Macon.

History 
Tift College was founded in 1849 as the Forsyth Female Collegiate Institute. It was renamed Monroe College in 1857 and as Bessie Tift College in 1907 in honor of an alumna. In 1898, it became affiliated with the Georgia Baptist Convention. The name was shortened to Tift College in 1956.

Tift College merged with Mercer University in Macon, Georgia in 1986. Mercer and the Tift College Alumnae Association joined together to form a partnership to preserve the legacy of Tift College. In 1987 the college was closed by Mercer. The Mercer University Board of Trustees voted to change the name of its School of Education to the Tift College of Education to carry on the educational legacy of Tift College.

Over the years, Mercer has continued to maintain the heritage, identity and ideals of Tift College, most notably through the Tift College Scholars Program. The program honors a select group of young women at Mercer with scholarships and inclusion in one of the university's most distinguished scholastic organizations.

In 2006, the governor announced plans to use the Forsyth campus for the headquarters of the Georgia Department of Corrections. After renovation of buildings for this purpose, the move took place in 2010.

Legacy and honors
 Tift College of Education at Mercer University
 Tift College Scholars Program, for young women

See also

 List of colleges and universities in Georgia
 List of current and historical women's universities and colleges

References

External links
 "Tift College State Historical Marker,"  GeorgiaInfo

Further reading
 State Offices South at Tift College - After Photos - Georgia Department of Corrections

External links

 https://web.archive.org/web/20140829082031/http://www.dcor.state.ga.us/NewsRoom/VideoLibrary/Video_Tift_Groundbreaking.htm
 Tift College Alumnae Association
 Mercer University
 Microsoft Office Support

Educational institutions established in 1849
Defunct private universities and colleges in Georgia (U.S. state)
Former women's universities and colleges in the United States
Mercer University
Embedded educational institutions
Defunct Christian universities and colleges
Educational institutions disestablished in 1986
1849 establishments in Georgia (U.S. state)
History of women in Georgia (U.S. state)